Janusz Nasfeter (15 August 1920 in Warsaw – 1 April 1998 in Warsaw) was a Polish film director, screenwriter and writer. A graduate of the National Film School in Łódź (1951). Mostly known for films addressed to children but with a universal meaning, for which he received numerous awards at the film festivals in Gdańsk, San Sebastián, Moscow, Belgrade, Venice, Tehran and many others

In the 1960s,  he succeeded also in making a war film Ranny w lesie (1964), a psychological war drama Weekend z dziewczyną (1968), as well as a crime film Zbrodniarz i panna (1963) with Zbigniew Cybulski and Niekochana (1966) with Elżbieta Czyżewska.

Nasfeter was originally buried at the Służew Old Cemetery, but his remains were moved to a family grave in the Powązki Cemetery in 2018.

Selected filmography
 Królowa pszczół (1977) (Queen of Bees)
 Nie będę cię kochać (1974) (I will not love you)
 Motyle (1973) (Butterflies)
 Ten okrutny, nikczemny chłopak (1972) (This Cruel, Wicked Boy)
 Abel, twój brat (1970) (Abel, Your Brother)
 Weekend z dziewczyną (1968) (Weekend with a Girl)
 Niekochana (1966)  (Unloved)
 Ranny w lesie (1964) (The Wounded in the Forest)
 Zbrodniarz i panna (1963) (The Criminal and the Maiden)
 Kolorowe pończochy (1960) (Coloured stockings)
 Małe dramaty (1958) (Small Dramas)

References

External links
 
 Janusz Nasfeter - films at the MUBI
 Janusz Nasfeter at the Dawny Wołomin 
 Janusz Nasfeter at the Onet.film 

1920 births
Polish film directors
1998 deaths
20th-century Polish screenwriters
Male screenwriters
20th-century Polish male writers
Burials at Służew Old Cemetery
Burials at Powązki Cemetery
Film people from Warsaw